The prehistory of the Philippines covers the events prior to the written history of what is now the Philippines. The current demarcation between this period and the early history of the Philippines is April 21, 900, which is the equivalent on the Proleptic Gregorian calendar for the date indicated on the Laguna Copperplate Inscription—the earliest known surviving written record to come from the Philippines. This period saw the immense change that took hold of the archipelago from Stone Age cultures in 50000 BC to the emergence of developed thalassocratic civilizations in the fourth century, continuing on with the gradual widening of trade until 900 and the first surviving written records.

Pleistocene

Kalinga artifacts and fossil fauna remains
A 2018 study led by Thomas Ingicco, which analyzed rhino remains unearthed in a Kalinga site using several dating techniques, pushes back the arrival of the first Homo species to the early Chibanian (late Pleistocene), between 631,000 and 777,000 years ago.

Site description

Unearthed in the site was a 'nearly complete, disarticulated' rhinoceros skeleton, of the extinct species Rhinoceros philippinensis. It showed ridges left by tools made while removing flesh, and special tools designed to remove bone marrow. The site yielded more than 400 bones, including several dozen knapped and chipped tools, of which 49 are knife-like flakes with two hammers. Also, among the finds are other skeletal remains, which include brown deer, monitor lizards, freshwater turtles and stegodonts.

Hominins
While the earliest confirmed evidence of a hominin came from a 67,000-year-old foot bone from Sierra Madre discovered in 2007, those finds had no direct trace of the butchers of the animals. On the other hand, it is possible that the butchers had by then evolved into a distinct subspecies.

Callao Man (c. 67,000 years ago) 

The earliest known hominin remains in the Philippines is the fossil discovered in 2007 in the Callao Caves in Cagayan. The 67,000-year-old find predates the 47,000-year-old Tabon Man, which was until then the earliest known set of human remains in the archipelago. The find consisted of a single 61 millimeter metatarsal which was dated using uranium series ablation. It was initially thought to be possibly one of the oldest Homo sapiens remains in the Asia-Pacific.

Homo luzonensis (c. 50,000–67,000 years ago) 

In the same stratigraphic layer where the third metatarsal was discovered, continued excavations revealed 12 fossil bones (7  postcanine maxillary teeth, 2 manual phalanges, 2 pedal phalanges, 1 femoral shaft) from three hominin individuals. These remains and the Callao Man were identified to belong to a new species of hominins, Homo luzonensis.

Stone Age (c. 50,000 – c. 500 BC) 
The first evidence of the systematic use of Stone Age technology in the Philippines is estimated to 50,000 BC, and this phase in the development of proto-Philippine societies is considered to end with the rise of metal tools in about 500 BC, albeit with stone tools still used past that date. Filipino anthropologist F. Landa Jocano refers to the earliest noticeable stage in the development of proto-Philippine societies as the Formative Phase. He also identified stone tools and ceramic manufacture as the two core industries that defined the period's economic activity, and which shaped the means by which early Filipinos adapted to their environment during this period.

By about 30,000 BC, the Negritos, who became the ancestors of today's aboriginal Filipinos (such as the Aeta), probably lived in the archipelago. No evidence has survived which would indicate details of ancient Filipino life such as their crops, culture, and architecture. Historian William Henry Scott noted any theory which describes such details for the period must be pure hypothesis, and thus be honestly presented as such.

Tabon Man (c. 24,000 or 22,000 BC) 

Fossilized fragments of a skull and jawbone of three individuals had been discovered on May 28, 1962 by Dr. Robert B. Fox, an American anthropologist of the National Museum. These fragments are collectively called "Tabon Man" after the place where they were found on the west coast of Palawan. Tabon Cave appears to be a kind of a Stone Age factory, with both finished stone flake tools and waste core flakes having been found at four separate levels in the main chamber. Charcoal left from three assemblages of cooking fires there has been Carbon-14 dated to roughly 7,000, 20,000, and 22,000 BC. These remains are the oldest modern human remains found on the islands, and have been U/Th-dated to 47,000 ± 11–10,000 years ago. (In Mindanao, the existence and importance of these prehistoric tools was noted by famed José Rizal himself, because of his acquaintance with Spanish and German scientific archaeologists in the 1880s, while in Europe.)

Tabon Cave is named after the "Tabon bird" (Tabon scrubfowl, Megapodius cumingii), which deposited thick hard layers of guano during the period when the cave was still uninhabited, resulting to a cement-like floor made of bird dung where three succeeding groups of tool-makers settled. It is indicated that about half of the 3,000 specimens recovered from the cave are discarded cores of a material which had to be transported from some distance.  The Tabon man fossils are considered to have come from the third group of inhabitants who inhabited the cave between 22,000 and 20,000 BC. An earlier cave level lies so far below the level containing cooking fire assemblages that it must represent Upper Pleistocene dates from 45 or 50 thousand years ago.

Physical anthropologists who have examined the Tabon Man skullcap have agreed that it belonged to a modern man (Homo sapiens), as distinguished from the mid-Pleistocene Homo erectus species. This indicates that Tabon Man was Pre-Mongoloid (Mongoloid being the term anthropologists apply to the racial stock which entered Southeast Asia during the Holocene and absorbed earlier peoples to produce the modern Malay, Indonesian, Filipino, and "Pacific" peoples). Two experts have given the opinion that the mandible is "Australian" in physical type, and that the skullcap measurements are most nearly like the Ainus or Tasmanians. Nothing can be concluded about Tabon man's physical appearance from the recovered skull fragments except that he was not a Negrito.

The custom of Jar Burial, which ranges from Sri Lanka, to the Plain of Jars, in Laos, to Japan, also was practiced in the Tabon caves. A spectacular example of a secondary burial jar is owned by the National Museum, a National Treasure, with a jar lid topped with two figures, one the deceased, arms crossed, hands touching the shoulders, the other a steersman, both seated in a proa, with only the mast missing from the piece. Secondary burial was practiced across all the islands of the Philippines during this period, with the bones reburied, some in the burial jars. Seventy-eight earthenware vessels were recovered from the Manunggul cave, Palawan, specifically for burial.

Human remains in the cave are from both large and small individuals. The latter fit well with Philippine negritos who were among the archipelago's earliest inhabitants, descendants of the first human migrations out of Africa via the coastal route along southern Asia to the now sunken landmasses of Sundaland and Sahul.

Migration theories

Austronesian expansion

The current scientific consensus of the settlement of the Philippines is the Out-of-Taiwan (OOT) hypothesis (also called the Austronesian expansion). It was first proposed by Peter Bellwood and was originally based largely on linguistics, hewing very close to Robert Blust’s model of the history of the Austronesian language family. It has since been strengthened by genetic and archaeological studies that broadly agree with the timeline of the Austronesian expansion.

The connections between the various Austronesian peoples have also been known since the colonial era due to shared material culture and linguistic similarities of various peoples of the islands of the Indo-Pacific, leading to the designation of Austronesians as the "Malay race" (not to be confused with the Melayu people) or the "Brown race" during the age of scientific racism by Johann Friedrich Blumenbach.

The modern Austronesian expansion model indicates that between 4500 BC and 4000 BC, developments in agricultural technology in the Yunnan Plateau in China created pressures which drove certain peoples to migrate to Taiwan. These people either already had or began to develop a unique language of their own, now referred to as Proto-Austronesian. By around 3000 BC, these groups started differentiating into three or four distinct subcultures. By 2500 to 1500 BC, one of these groups (the ancestral Malayo-Polynesian-speakers) began migrating southwards by sea towards the Philippines, then further onwards to the Marianas Islands by 1500 BC, and the rest of Island Southeast Asia, Island Melanesia, and eventually as far as Polynesia and Madagascar.

The Austronesians that settled in the Philippines admixed with the preexisting earlier groups like the Negritos that had reached the islands via the now sunken Sundaland landmass. Genetic studies have shown that modern native Filipinos have varying degrees of Negrito ancestry in addition to the majority Austronesian ancestry.

A 2021 genetic study, which examined representatives of 115 indigenous communities, found evidence of at least five independent waves of early human migration. Negrito groups, divided between those in Luzon and those in Mindanao, may come from a single wave and diverged subsequently, or through two separate waves. This likely occurred sometime after 46,000 years ago. Another Negrito migration entered Mindanao sometime after 25,000 years ago. Two early East Asian waves were detected, one most strongly evidenced among the Manobo people who live in inland Mindanao, and the other in the Sama-Bajau and related people of the Sulu archipelago, Zamboanga Peninsula, and Palawan. The admixture found in the Sama people indicates a relationship with the Lua and Mlabri people of mainland Southeast Asia, and reflects a similar genetic signal found in western Indonesia. These happened sometime after 15,000 years ago and 12,000 years ago respectively, around the time the last glacial period was coming to an end. Austronesians, either from Southern China or Taiwan, were found to have come in at least two distinct waves. The first, occurring perhaps between 10,000 and 7,000 years ago, brought the ancestors of indigenous groups that today live around the Cordillera Central mountain range. Later migrations brought other Austronesian groups, along with agriculture, and the languages of these recent Austronesian migrants effectively replaced those existing populations. In all cases, new immigrants appear to have mixed to some degree with existing populations. The integration of Southeast Asia into Indian Ocean trading networks around 2,000 years ago also shows some impact, with South Asian genetic signals present within some Sama-Bajau communities.

Other models
Older and competing models to the mainstream Out-of-Taiwan hypothesis include:

Beyer's wave migration theory (Theory of Waves of Migration)
The first, and most widely known theory of the prehistoric peopling of the Philippines is that of H. Otley Beyer, founder of the Anthropology Department of the University of the Philippines. According to Dr. Beyer, the ancestors of the Filipinos came to the islands first via land bridges which would occur during times when the sea level was low, and then later in seagoing vessels such as the balangay.  Thus he differentiated these ancestors as arriving in different "waves of migration", as follows:

 "Dawn Man", a type similar to Java man, Peking Man, and other Asian Homo erectus of 250,000 years ago.
 The aboriginal pygmy group, the Negritos, who arrived between 25,000 and 30,000 years ago.
 The seafaring tool-using "Indonesian" group who arrived about 5,000 to 6,000 years ago and were the first immigrants to reach the Philippines by sea.
 The seafaring "Malays" who brought the Iron Age culture and were the real colonizers and dominant cultural group in the pre-Hispanic Philippines.

Beyer's theory, while still popular among lay Filipinos, has been generally been disputed by anthropologists and historians. Reasons for doubting it are founded on Beyer's use of 19th century scientific methods of progressive evolution and migratory diffusion as the basis for his hypothesis. These methods have since been proven to be too simple and unreliable to explain the prehistoric peopling of the Philippines.

Objections to the land bridges theory
In February 1976, Fritjof Voss, a German scientist who studied the geology of the Philippines, questioned the validity of the theory of land bridges. He maintained that the Philippines was never part of mainland Asia. He claimed that it arose from the bottom of the sea and, as the thin Pacific crust moved below it, continued to rise. It continues to rise today. The country lies along great Earth faults that extend to deep submarine trenches. The resulting violent earthquakes caused what is now the land masses forming the Philippines to rise to the surface of the sea. Dr. Voss also pointed out that when scientific studies were done on the Earth's crust from 1964 to 1967, it was discovered that the 35-kilometer- thick crust underneath China does not reach the Philippines. Thus, the latter could not have been a land bridge to the Asian mainland. The matter of who the first settlers were has not been really resolved. This is being disputed by anthropologists, as well as Professor H. Otley Beyer, who claims that the first inhabitants of the Philippines came from the Malay Peninsula. The Malays now constitute the largest portion of the populace and what Filipinos now have is an Austronesian culture.

Philippine historian William Henry Scott has pointed out that Palawan and the Calamianes Islands are separated from Borneo by water nowhere deeper than 100 meters, that south of a line drawn between Saigon and Brunei does the depth of the South China Sea nowhere exceeds 100 meters, and that the Strait of Malacca reaches 50 meters only at one point. Scott also asserts that the Sulu Archipelago is not the peak of a submerged mountain range connecting Mindanao and Borneo, but the exposed edge of three small ridges produced by tectonic tilting of the sea bottom in recent geologic times. According to Scott, it is clear that Palawan and the Calamianes do not stand on a submerged land bridge, but were once a hornlike protuberance on the shoulder of a continent whose southern shoreline used to be the present islands of Java and Borneo. Mindoro and the Calamianes are separated by a channel more than 500 meters deep

Solheim's Nusantao Maritime Trading and Communication Network (NMTCN) or island origin theory
Wilhelm Solheim's concept of the Nusantao Maritime Trading and Communication Network (NMTCN), while not strictly a theory regarding the biological ancestors of modern Southeast Asians, does suggest that the patterns of cultural diffusion throughout the Asia-Pacific region are not what would be expected if such cultures were to be explained by simple migration.  Where Bellwood based his analysis primarily on linguistic analysis, Solheim's approach was based on artifact findings.  On the basis of a careful analysis of artifacts, he suggests the existence of a trade and communication network that first spread in the Asia-Pacific region during its Neolithic age (c.8,000 to 500 BC). According to Solheim's NMTCN theory, this trade network, consisting of both Austronesian and non-Austronesian seafaring peoples, was responsible for the spread of cultural patterns throughout the Asia-Pacific region, not the simple migration proposed by the Out-of-Taiwan hypothesis.

Solheim came up with four geographical divisions delineating the spread of the NMTCN over time, calling these geographical divisions "lobes." Specifically, these were the central, northern, eastern and western lobes.

The central lobe was further divided into two smaller lobes reflecting phases of cultural spread: the Early Central Lobe and the Late Central Lobe. Instead of Austronesian peoples originating from Taiwan, Solheim placed the origins of the early NMTCN peoples in the "Early Central Lobe," which was in eastern coastal Vietnam, at around 9000 BC.

He then suggests the spread of peoples around 5000 BC towards the "Late central lobe", including the Philippines, via island Southeast Asia, rather than from the north as the Taiwan theory suggests. Thus, from the Point of view of the Philippine peoples, the NMTCN is also referred to as the Island Origin Theory.

This "late central lobe" included southern China and Taiwan, which became "the area where Austronesian became the original language family and Malayo-Polynesian developed."   In about 4000 to 3000 BC, these peoples continued spreading east through Northern Luzon to Micronesia to form the Early Eastern Lobe, carrying the Malayo-Polynesian languages with them.  These languages would become part of the culture spread by the NMTCN in its expansions Malaysia and western towards Malaysia before 2000 BC, continuing along coastal India and Sri Lanka up to the western coast of Africa and Madagascar; and over time, further eastward towards its easternmost borders at Easter Island. Thus, as in the case of Bellwood's theory, the Austronesian languages spread eastward and westward from the area around the Philippines.  Aside from the matter of the origination of peoples, the difference between the two theories is that Bellwood's theory suggests a linear expansion, while Solheim's suggests something more akin to concentric circles, all overlapping in the geographical area of the late central lobe which includes the Philippines.

Jocano's local origins theory (Core Population)
Another alternative model is that asserted by anthropologist F. Landa Jocano of the University of the Philippines, who in 2001 contended that the existing fossil evidence of ancient humans demonstrates that they not only migrated to the Philippines, but also to New Guinea, Borneo, and Australia.  In reference to Beyer's wave model, he points out that there is no definitive way to determine the "race" of the human fossils; the only certain thing is that the discovery of Tabon Man proves that the Philippines was inhabited as early as 21,000 or 22,000 years ago. If this is true, the first inhabitants of the Philippines would not have come from the Malay Peninsula. Instead, Jocano postulates that present day Filipinos are products of the long process of evolution and movement of people. He also adds that this is also true of Indonesians and Malaysians, with none among the three peoples being the dominant carrier of culture.  In fact, he suggests that the ancient humans who populated Southeast Asia cannot be categorized under any of these three groups.  He thus further suggests that it is not correct to consider Filipino culture as being Malayan in orientation.

Genetic studies

A 2002 China Medical University study indicated that some Filipinos shared genetic chromosome that is found among Asian people, such as Taiwanese aborigines, Indonesians, Thais, and Chinese.

In a 2003 research study by the University of the Philippines, genetic  mutations were found in Filipinos which are shared by people from different parts of East Asia, and Southeast Asia. The predominant genotype detected was SC, the Southeast Asian genotype. However, only about 50 urine samples were collected for the study, far below the minimum sample size needed to account for credible test results.

A 2008 genetic study by Leeds University and published in Molecular Biology and Evolution, showed that mitochondrial DNA lineages have been evolving within Island Southeast Asia (ISEA) since modern humans arrived approximately 50,000 years ago. The authors concluded that it was proof that Austronesians evolved within Island Southeast Asia and did not come from Taiwan (the "Out-of-Sundaland" hypothesis). Population dispersals occurred at the same time as sea levels rose, which resulted in migrations from the Philippine Islands into Taiwan within the last 10,000 years.

A 2013 study on the genetics and origin of Polynesian people supported the Out of Taiwan scenario of Austronesian expansion from Taiwan, at around 2200 BC, settling the Batanes Islands and northern Luzon from Taiwan. From there, they rapidly spread downwards to the rest of the islands of the Philippines and Southeast Asia. This population assimilated with the existing Negritos resulting in the modern Filipino ethnic groups which display various ratios of genetic admixture between Austronesian and Negrito groups.

However, a 2014 study published by Nature using whole genome sequencing instead of only mtDNA sequencing confirmed the north-to-south dispersal of the Austronesian peoples in the "Out-of-Taiwan" hypothesis. Researchers further pointed out that, while humans have been living in Sundaland for at least 40,000 years, Austronesian people were recent arrivals. The results of the 2008 study failed to take into account admixture with the more ancient but unrelated Negrito and Papuan populations.

Another study about the ancestral composition of modern ethnic groups in the Philippines from 2021 suggests that distinctive Basal-East Asian (East-Eurasian) ancestry originated in Mainland Southeast Asia at ~50,000BC, and expanded through multiple migration waves southwards and northwards respectively. Basal-East Asian ancestry, as well as later Austroasiatic ancestry, from Mainland Southeast Asia, arrived into the Philippines prior to the Austronesian expansion. Austronesian-speakers themself are suggested to have arrived on Taiwan and the northern Philippines between 10,000BC to 7,000BC from coastal southern China. The authors concluded that the Austronesian expansion into Insular Southeast Asia and Polynesia was outgoing from the Philippines rather than Taiwan, and that modern Austronesian-speaking people have largely ancestry from the earliest Basal-East Asians, Austroasiatic migrants from Mainland Southeast Asia, and Austronesian-speaking seafarers from the Philippines.

Proto-Austronesians

Before the expansion out of Taiwan, recent archaeological, linguistic and genetic evidence has linked Austronesian speakers in Insular Southeast Asia to cultures such as the Hemudu, Liangzhu and Dapenkeng in Neolithic China.

Bolobok Archaeological Site (6810–3190 BC)
The site is one of the earliest human settlement zones in the region. The site itself is part of a huge karst system with layers of shells and other minerals made by early humans. More excavation led to discovery of ancient artifacts like flake tools, polished stones, earthenware shards, bone tools and some animal remains. These remains and artifacts were dated by C-14 to be around 8,810 to 5,190 years ago, making the site one of the most significant archaeological sites in the region. The site was declared an Important Cultural Property in 2017 by the National Government.

5000–2000 BC—Austronesian speakers arrive

Historian William Henry Scott has observed that, based on lexicostatistical analysis involving seven million word pairs linguist Isidore Dyen offered in 1962, two alternative scenarios explaining the origin and spread of Austronesian languages: (a) that they originated in some Pacific island and spread westward to Asia, or (b) that they originated in Taiwan and spread southward. Based on subsequent study of the second alternative, Scott concludes that the Philippine language tree could have been introduced by Austronesian speakers as long ago as 5000 BC, probably from the north, with their descendants expanding throughout the Philippine archipelago and beyond in succeeding millennia, absorbing or replacing sparse populations already present, and their language diversifying into dozens of mutually unintelligible languages which replaced earlier ones. During those millennia, other Austronesian speakers entered the Philippines in large enough numbers to leave a linguistic mark but not to replace established languages. Scott suggested that if this scenario is correct all present Philippine languages (except for Sama–Bajaw languages, which probably have more speakers outside the Philippines than within) were produced within the archipelago, none of them being introduced by separate migration, and all of them having more in common with each other than with languages outside of the Philippines.

During this neolithic period, a trade route initially created primarily by natives of the Philippines and Taiwan was established. The route, known as the Maritime Jade Road, was one of the most extensive sea-based trade networks of a single geological material in the prehistoric world from 2000 BCE-1000 CE, much older than the Silk Road. Jade was mined in Taiwan and was processed primarily in the Philippines, where the trade route reached many places in Southeast Asia such as Vietnam, Thailand, Malaysia, and Indonesia. A "jade culture" thrived during this era, as evidenced by tens of thousands of exquisitely crafted jade artifacts found at a site in Batangas province. Jade artifacts have been found dated to 2000 BC, with the lingling-o jade items crafted in Luzon made using raw materials originating from Taiwan. The Maritime Jade Road's operation coincided with 1,500 years of near absolute peace throughout the Philippines, from 500 BC to 1000 AD. During this peaceful pre-colonial period, not a single burial site studied by scholars yielded any osteological proof for violent death. No instances of mass burials were recorded as well, signifying the peaceful situation of the islands. Burials with violent proof were only found from burials beginning in the 15th century, likely due to the newer cultures of expansionism imported from India and China. When the Spanish arrived in the 16th century, they recorded some war-like groups, whose cultures have already been influenced by the imported Indian and Chinese expansionist cultures of the 15th century. By 1000 BC, the inhabitants of the archipelago had developed into four kinds of social groups: hunter-gatherer tribes, warrior societies, highland plutocracies, and port principalities.

Timeline of Iron Age

Dates are approximate, consult particular article for details
 Prehistoric (or Proto-historic) Iron Age  Historic Iron Age

Early Metal Age (c. 500 BC – c. 1 AD)
Although there is some evidence early Austronesian migrants having bronze or brass tools, the earliest metal tools in the Philippines are generally said to have first been used somewhere around 500 BC, and this new technology coincided with considerable changes in the lifestyle of early Filipinos.  The new tools brought about a more stable way of life, and created more opportunities for communities to grow, both in terms of size and cultural development.

Where communities once consisted of small bands of kinsmen living in campsites, larger villages came about- usually based near water, which made traveling and trading easier. The resulting ease of contact between communities meant that they began to share similar cultural traits, something which had not previously been possible when the communities consisted only of small kinship groups.

Jocano refers to the period between 500 BC and 1 AD as the incipient phase, which for the first time in the artifact record, sees the presence of artifacts that are similar in design from site to site throughout the archipelago. Along with the use of metal tools, this era also saw significant improvement in pottery technology.

Proto-historic era

Trade with the Sa Huynh culture 
The Sa Huynh culture in what is now central and southern Vietnam had extensive trade with the Philippine archipelago during its height between 1000 BC and 200 AD. 

Sa Huynh beads were made from glass, carnelian, agate, olivine, zircon, gold and garnet; most of these materials were not local to the region, and were most likely imported. Han Dynasty-style bronze mirrors were also found in Sa Huynh sites. Conversely, Sa Huynh produced ear ornaments have been found in archaeological sites in Central Thailand, Taiwan (Orchid Island), and in the Philippines, in the Palawan Tabon Caves. in The Kalanay Cave is a small cave located on the island of Masbate in central Philippines. The cave is located specifically at the northwest coast of the island within the municipality of Aroroy. The artifacts recovered from the site were similar to those found in Southeast Asia and South Vietnam. The site is one of the "Sa Huynh-Kalanay" pottery complex which is shares similarities with Vietnam. The type of pottery found in the site were dated 400BC-1500 AD.

100 BC onward
Iron Age finds in Philippines also point to the existence of trade between Tamil Nadu and the Philippine Islands during the ninth and tenth centuries B.C. The Philippines is believed by some historians to be the island of Chryse, the "Golden One," which is the name given by ancient Greek writers in reference to an island rich in gold east of India. Pomponius Mela, Marinos of Tyre and the Periplus of the Erythraean Sea mentioned this island in 100 BC, and it is basically the equivalent to the Indian Suvarnadvipa, the "Island of Gold." Josephus calls it in Latin Aurea, and equates the island with biblical Ophir, from where the ships of Tyre and Solomon brought back gold and other trade items.

Ptolemy locates the islands of Chryse east of the Khruses Kersonenson, the "Golden Peninsula," i.e. the Malaya Peninsula. North of Chryse in the Periplus was Thin, which some consider the first European reference to China. In about the 200 BC, there arose a practice of using gold eye covers, and then, gold facial orifice covers to adorn the dead resulting in an increase of ancient gold finds.
During the Qin dynasty and the Tang dynasty, China was well aware of the golden lands far to the south. The Buddhist pilgrim I-Tsing mentions Chin-Chou, "Isle of Gold" in the archipelago south of China on his way back from India. Medieval Muslims refer to the islands as the Kingdoms of Zabag and Wāḳwāḳ, rich in gold, referring, perhaps, to the eastern islands of the Malay archipelago, the location of present-day Philippines and Eastern Indonesia.

Thalassocracies and international trade (200 AD onwards)

The emergence of Barangay city-states and trade (200–500)

Maritime Southeast Asia began to be integrated into wider trade networks in the early centuries of the first millennium, with trade between China and the region becoming regular by the 5th century.

Fragmented ethnic groups established numerous city-states formed by the assimilation of several small political units known as barangay each headed by a Datu or headman (still in use among non-Hispanic Filipino ethnic groups) and answerable to a king, titled Rajah. Even scattered barangays, through the development of inter-island and international trade, became more culturally homogeneous by the 4th century. Hindu-Buddhist culture and religion flourished among the noblemen in this era. Many of the barangay were, to varying extents, under the de jure jurisprudence of one of several neighboring empires, among them the Malay Sri Vijaya, Javanese Majapahit, Brunei, Melaka empires, although de facto had established their own independent system of rule. Trading links with Sumatra, Borneo, Thailand, Java, China, India, Arabia, Japan and the Ryukyu Kingdom flourished during this era. A thalassocracy had thus emerged based on international trade.

Each barangay consisted of about 100 families. Some barangays were big, such as Zubu (Cebu), Butuan, Maktan (Mactan), Mandani (Mandaue), Lalan (Liloan), Irong-Irong (Iloilo), Bigan (Vigan), and Selurong (Manila). Each of these big barangays had a population of more than 2,000.

In the earliest times, the items which were prized by the peoples included jars, which were a symbol of wealth throughout South Asia, and later metal, salt and tobacco. In exchange, the peoples would trade feathers, rhino horn, hornbill beaks, beeswax, birds nests, resin, rattan.2 Wrought iron were produced and processed in the Philippines and exported to Taiwan.

In the period between the 7th century to the beginning of the 15th century, numerous prosperous centers of trade had emerged, including the Kingdom of Namayan which flourished alongside Manila Bay, Cebu, Iloilo, Butuan, the Kingdom of Sanfotsi situated in Pangasinan, the Kingdoms of Zabag and Wak-Wak situated in Pampanga and Aparri (which specialized in trade with Japan and the Kingdom of Ryukyu in Okinawa).

Introduction of metal
The introduction of metal into the Philippines and the resulting changes did not follow the typical pattern. Robert Fox notes, "There is, for example, no real evidence of a "Bronze Age" or "Copper-Bronze Age" in the archipelago, a development which occurred in many areas of the world.  The transition, as shown by recent excavation, was from stone tools to iron tools."

The earliest use of metal in the Philippines was the use of copper for ornamentation, not tools.  Even when copper and bronze tools became common, they were often used side by side with stone tools.  Metal only became the dominant material for tools late in this era, leading to a new phase in cultural development.

Bronze tools from the Philippines' early metal age have been encountered in various sites, but they were not widespread.  This has been attributed to the lack of a local source of tin, which when combined with copper produces bronze. This lack has led most anthropologists to conclude that bronze items were imported and that those bronze smelting sites which have been found in the Philippines, in Palawan, were for re-smelting and remolding.

Introduction of iron
Iron Age finds in Philippines also point to the existence of trade between Tamil Nadu and the Philippine Islands during the ninth and tenth centuries B.C. When iron was introduced to the Philippines, it became the preferred material for tools and largely ended the use of stone tools. Whether the iron was imported or mined locally is still debated by scholars. Beyer thought that it was mined locally, but others point to the lack of iron smelting artifacts and conclude that the iron tools were probably imported.

Metalsmiths from this era had already developed a crude version of modern metallurgical processes, notably the hardening of soft iron through carburization.

Archaeological sources

Until very recently, scholars have limited sources or access to artifacts discovered since the 19th century. During the Spanish colonial era, which began in 1521, many artifacts were destroyed or re-used. A good example is the Spanish walled city of Intramuros in Manila, whose stone bricks were taken from the original city wall of pre-Hispanic Maynila.  As new evidence is discovered, old theories are adapted or new ones developed, which has led to numerous and sometimes conflicting theories about the prehistory of the Philippines, leading to a lack of consensus among archaeologists and historians.

See also
Emergence of agriculture in the Philippines
Ancient Filipino diet and health
Cultural achievements of pre-colonial Philippines
Shell tools in the Philippines
Stegodon
Barangay (pre-colonial)
Prehistoric Asia
Prehistory of Marinduque
Prehistory of Pampanga
Prehistory of Sarangani
Dambana
Suyat
History of the Philippines
History of the Philippines (before 1521)
History of the Philippines (Pre-Colonial Era 900–1521)
History of the Philippines (Spanish Era 1521–1898)
History of the Philippines (American Era 1898–1946)
History of the Philippines (Third Republic 1946–65)
History of the Philippines (Marcos Era 1965–86)
History of the Philippines (Contemporary Era 1986–present)

Notes

References
.
.
.

.
.
.

Further reading

.
.

External links
The Timeline of the History of the Philippines (archived from the original on 2005-10-30)

 
History of the Philippines by period
Prehistoric Asia
Prehistoric Asia by country
National prehistories